Mick Hoy may refer to:

Mick Hoy (footballer), Irish footballer 
Mick Hoy (musician) (1913–2000), Irish musician